Shamsun Nahar Iffat Ara, known as Iffat Ara, is a writer, social activist and literary organizer of Bangladesh. Her literary career began in late 1950s when she started to write short stories and publish them in the leading newspaper of the country including the Azad.

Life and education 

Iffat Ara was born to Maulavi Quazi Abdul Hakim and Mosammat Hajera Khatun in Mymensingh town in 1939. She struggled hard for formal education, first learning Arabic at home to be able to read the Quran. She then went to Muslim Girls' School for primary education. After her primary education was over, her father withdrew her from the school since, at that time, higher education for girls was not considered necessary. Desperate to continue education, she threatened to commit suicide and was subsequently admitted to the Vidyamoyee Govt. Girls' High School of the town. But before she could complete the high school she was married to Abdul Latif Talukder, a young lawyer and politician. Luckily it was a short interruption and she could appear in the Matriculate examination the next year. Later, she passed Intermediate from the Muminunnesa Women's College. In 1966 she graduated from the same college and proceeded to study for B. Ed. at the Mymensingh Women's Teachers Training College. When Ananda Mohan College was upgraded to a university-college, Iffat Ara lost no time to get admitted for her Masters in Bengali language and literature.

Personality and philosophy 

To her, life is work, work is life. She believes in women freedom but does not think marriage is a stumbling block on the way. She is religious and believes that Islam does not stand on the way for Muslim women to live a modern life. A very hospitable lady, Iffat Ara is near and dear to many in Mymensingh. She has mothered three children with utmost care and success. At her residence in Mymensingh town, she passes her time through writing, gardening and entertaining young authors and literary workers.

Women's movements 

Women's movements in Mymensingh could not be thought of without the active presence of Iffat Ara since the 1960s. She became involved in social welfare activities for women with her membership of All Pakistan Women's Association in 1966. After birth of Bangladesh in 1971, she, in association with others like author Helena Khan, Sufia Karim and politician Mariam Hashimuddin took initiative to set up Mahila Samity (tr. Women's Association). Later she organized the Mymensingh chapter of the Bangladesh Jatiyo Mahila Sangtha, an organization sponsored by the government. She contributed substantially in establishing Udayan High School in Mymensingh in 1988. Since her marriage she was in touch with politics but never opted for joining politics.

Professional career 

In 1968, Iffat Ara joined Nasirabad Girls' School as an assistant teacher and retired from there as its headmistress in 1972. Later she took up the job of feature editor for the women's page of the weekly Banglar Darpan published from Mymensingh. When the same establishment started to publish a monthly women's magazine, titled Chandrakash, in 1973, Iffat Ara was appointed its editor. She worked as editor of Chandrakash till 1979.

Publications 
Iffat Ara has published nine titles to her credit. They include novels, a collection of short stories, a book of knowledge for children and essays. She also edited Bangladesher Jonopriyo Kavita (tr. Popular poems from Bangladesh), a collection of Bengali poems since the late 18th century. Her unique book of knowledge for high school goers Shona achey jana nai was highly acclaimed and has gone through many editions since 1990. Her novel Sukh jakhan shesh belay was published in 2000. Currently she is working on a book of short stories for young readers.

Dwitiyo Chinta 

She set up a press in her house and started to publish a literary monthly magazine Chinta in 1986. Later it was renamed Dwitiyo Chinta in 1988. Soon Iffat Mansion, her residence in Mymensingh town since 1960, from where she published her magazine, became a hub of literary activities. The poet Jibanananda Das birth centenary edition of the Dwitiyo Chinta, brought out in 1999, remains an example of high quality editing and planning of a commemorative issue of a magazine. Dwitiyo Chinta has published writings of many eminent writers and poets of the country in addition to regional writers.

References 

1939 births
Living people
Bangladeshi feminists
Bangladeshi women novelists
Bengali-language writers
Bengali novelists
People from Mymensingh District
20th-century Bangladeshi writers
20th-century Bangladeshi women writers
Women's page journalists